Alexander Henry Buckley, VC (22 July 1891 – 2 September 1918) was an Australian recipient of the Victoria Cross, the highest award for gallantry in the face of the enemy that can be awarded to British and Commonwealth forces.

Early life
Buckley was born on 22 July 1891 to James and Julia Buckley at Gulargambone, New South Wales, Australia. One of four children, he was home schooled on his parents' property Homebush during his childhood. After completing his schooling, he worked on the family farm with his father.

Military career
Buckley enlisted in the Australian Imperial Force on 3 February 1916, volunteering for overseas service. After completing basic training at Bathurst, New South Wales in June, he was sent to England among a draft of reinforcements. Just prior to departing Australia, Buckley became engaged. He was posted to 54th Battalion, an infantry battalion assigned to the 14th Brigade, which was part of the 5th Division.

Joining the battalion on the Western Front in November 1916 at Flers, France, Buckley served with it as it manned defensive positions along the Somme during the winter months. The following year, after the Germans withdrew towards the Hindenburg Line, Buckley took part in the fighting around Bullecourt, Polygon Wood and Broodseinde and in November 1917 he was promoted to temporary corporal. In August 1918, the 54th Battalion took part in the initial stages of the Allied Hundred Days Offensive around Amiens. On the night of 1/2 September 1918, at Peronne, France, during the Battle of Mont Saint-Quentin, Buckley performed the deeds that led to him being posthumously awarded the Victoria Cross.

He was originally buried at St Radegonde, but was later re-interred at Peronne Communal Cemetery Extension.

Citation

Medals
Buckley's Victoria Cross is displayed at the Australian War Memorial in Canberra. He also earned the British War Medal and the Victory Medal.

Notes

References

Further reading
 

1891 births
1918 deaths
Military personnel from New South Wales
Australian World War I recipients of the Victoria Cross
Australian Army soldiers
Australian military personnel killed in World War I